Fred Wolf may refer to:

Fred Wolf (animator) (born 1932), American animator
Fred Wolf (writer) (born 1964), American film director and writer
Fred Alan Wolf (born 1934), American theoretical physicist
Frederick Wolf (born 1952), American environmental health and safety researcher

See also
Friedrich Wolf (disambiguation)